Ryuko Hira (比良 竜虎) (born 30 May 1948) is a prominent Indian investor, is President of HMI Hotel Group and Ora Group of companies Japan, engaged in investment, ownership, and development of real estate, hospitality and tourism projects in railways, airports, seaports, and public transportation located in 31 cities in Japan. He plays a key role in directing Japanese investments towards India and pioneers in establishing agreements of co-operation between several Indian state governments and Japanese prefectures. He is one among the top ten richest Non-Resident Indians. He is also the richest Indian in Japan.

Born in 1948 at Jaipur, Hira graduated from Sitaram Prakash High School in Mumbai. Later, he studied a 12 week course at the Cornell University School of Hotel Administration and attended Japanese language courses at Sophia University, Tokyo. He has a diploma in character development from the Institute of Sathya Sai Education, Prasanthi Nilayam, Andhra Pradesh.

He joined his family business in 1966 in Japan wherein 300 foreign companies were established in Japan under the Anglo-Japanese treaty of 1902 of which 22 were renowned Sindhi silk merchant companies from British India and also imported iron ore, metals and sundries from India. In 1970, he invested in a joint venture to establish the Sun Route Hotel System Chain. The business grew rapidly and it soon became one of the most prominent foreign businesses, with an unprecedented broadcast of a one hour documentary on national television, NHK, December 1984. From 1985, he commenced real estate development of residences, townships, and commercial projects. Their Majesties of the Imperial Household have graced his hotels for three generations. He grew HMI Hotel Group, receiving more than 10 million guests each year and being ranked as the 8th largest hotel chain by the Nikkei Marketing Journal on 11 November 2020.

Hira is the Chairman of the Indian Commerce and Industry Association Japan (ICIJ), celebrating its 100 years of serving as an apex body to support and develop the economic and investment potential with India. He also serves in multiple economic and industrial organizations in Japan, including the Japan National Tourism Organization. In 2016, he served as a senior advisor to the Japanese Prime Minister's working group for the Ministry of Land, Infrastructure, Transport and Tourism. He has contributed extensively to the cultural and social interactions between India and Japan. He has sponsored and supported the translation and publication of Sanskrit and Hindi dictionaries in Japanese, as well as volumes of Mahabharata, Vedas, Upanishads and books on Hinduism, Buddhism and Sikhism. He is also a trustee for the Sri Sathya Sai Central Trust in Andhra Pradesh and is the founder of the Sai Hira India Foundation.

In 2022, the Government of India honored him with the Padma Shri award for his services in the field of trade and industry. He has been conferred with the Pravasi Bharatiya Samman by the Government of India in 2010. He has also been conferred with several Japanese travel and tourism awards. He was recognized for lectures on Buddhism at the Dongguk University in Korea and was honored at the Great Hall of the People for hosting the first All China Provinces' Human Values Essay Contest.

Early life
Hira pursued his secondary education at Hill Grange High School, a Cambridge school in Mumbai. In 1966, at the age of 16, he moved to Japan where his family had a business which started in Yokohama in 1921 as a silk exporter to India. The company eventually led to the founding of the HMI Group. He studied gemology in the Gemological Institute of America. He also completed a Certificate Course in Japanese language at Sophia University in Tokyo. To remain competitive in the global travel and tourism industry, Hira opted for Japanese citizenship in 1976 with the permission of the Indian government. At that time, he adopted the new name Ryuko Hira. According to Hira, he chose a name that can be written in kanji, the Japanese writing system using ideograms adapted from Chinese characters. Hira stands for the Hira Mountains in Shiga Prefecture, the place where a Japanese priest gave him his kanji name. Ryu (dragon) and ko (tiger) represent Japan and India.

Devotion to Sathya Sai Baba
Hira is a passionate devotee of Sathya Sai Baba, an Indian  guru from Puttaparthi in the present-day Anantapur district of the Indian state of Andhra Pradesh and has published a book on him.

Awards
In 2022, the government of India conferred on Hira the Padma Shri award, the third highest award in the Padma series of awards, for his distinguished service in the field of trade and industry, in recognition of his service as a "senior business leader in Japan instrumental in promoting India-Japan friendship".
In 2010, the government of India conferred on Hira the Pravasia Bharatiya Samman award, the highest Indian award for Non-resident Indian and Overseas Citizen of India or an organization or institution established and run by Non-Resident Indians or Persons of Indian Origin, for his entrepreneurship and his contribution to the Indian community in Japan in the cultural, economic and social fields.

See also
Padma Shri Award recipients in 2022

References

Additional reading
Extracts from Hira's Tryst with Divinity interview with Radio Sai's Karuna Munshi which was first broadcast on 6 August 2013: 
Article by Hira in a special iIssue of Sanathana Sarathi, a publication of the Sri Sathya Sai Sadhana Trust: 



People from Rajasthan
Indian diaspora in Japan
Recipients of the Padma Shri in trade and industry
1948 births
Living people